Glucagon is a peptide hormone, produced by alpha cells of the pancreas. It raises concentration of glucose and fatty acids in the bloodstream, and is considered to be the main catabolic hormone of the body. It is also used as a medication to treat a number of health conditions. Its effect is opposite to that of insulin, which lowers extracellular glucose. It is produced from proglucagon, encoded by the GCG gene.

The pancreas releases glucagon when the amount of glucose in the bloodstream is too low. Glucagon causes the liver to engage in glycogenolysis: converting stored glycogen into glucose, which is released into the bloodstream. High blood-glucose levels, on the other hand, stimulate the release of insulin. Insulin allows glucose to be taken up and used by insulin-dependent tissues. Thus, glucagon and insulin are part of a feedback system that keeps blood glucose levels stable. Glucagon increases energy expenditure and is elevated under conditions of stress. Glucagon belongs to the secretin family of hormones.

Structure 
Glucagon is a 29-amino acid polypeptide. Its primary structure in humans is: NH2-His-Ser-Gln-Gly-Thr-Phe-Thr-Ser-Asp-Tyr-Ser-Lys-Tyr-Leu-Asp-Ser-Arg-Arg-Ala-Gln-Asp-Phe-Val-Gln-Trp-Leu-Met-Asn-Thr-COOH (HSQGTFTSDYSKYLDSRRAQDFVQWLMNT).

The polypeptide has a molecular mass of 3485 daltons. Glucagon is a peptide (nonsteroid) hormone.

Physiology

Production 

The hormone is synthesized and secreted from alpha cells (α-cells) of the islets of Langerhans, which are located in the endocrine portion of the pancreas. Glucagon is produced from the preproglucagon gene Gcg. Preproglucagon first has its signal peptide removed by signal peptidase, forming the 160-amino acid protein proglucagon. Proglucagon is then cleaved by proprotein convertase 2 to glucagon (amino acids 33-61) in pancreatic islet α cells. In intestinal L cells, proglucagon is cleaved to the alternate products glicentin (1–69), glicentin-related pancreatic polypeptide (1–30), oxyntomodulin (33–69), glucagon-like peptide 1 (72–107 or 108), and glucagon-like peptide 2 (126–158).

In rodents, the alpha cells are located in the outer rim of the islet. Human islet structure is much less segregated, and alpha cells are distributed throughout the islet in close proximity to beta cells. Glucagon is also produced by alpha cells in the stomach.

Recent research has demonstrated that glucagon production may also take place outside the pancreas, with the gut being the most likely site of extrapancreatic glucagon synthesis.

Regulation 
Production, which is otherwise freerunning, is suppressed/regulated by amylin, a peptide hormone co-secreted with insulin from the pancreatic β cells. As plasma glucose levels recede, the subsequent reduction in amylin secretion alleviates its suppression of the α cells, allowing for glucagon secretion.

Secretion of glucagon is stimulated by:
 Hypoglycemia
 Epinephrine (via β2, α2, and α1 adrenergic receptors)
 Arginine
 Alanine (often from muscle-derived pyruvate/glutamate transamination (see alanine transaminase reaction).
 Acetylcholine
 Cholecystokinin
 Gastric inhibitory polypeptide

Secretion of glucagon is inhibited by:
 Somatostatin
 Amylin
 Insulin (via GABA)
 PPARγ/retinoid X receptor heterodimer.
 Increased free fatty acids and keto acids into the blood.
 Increased urea production
 Glucagon-like peptide-1

Function
Glucagon generally elevates the concentration of glucose in the blood by promoting gluconeogenesis and glycogenolysis. Glucagon also decreases fatty acid synthesis in adipose tissue and the liver, as well as promoting lipolysis in these tissues, which causes them to release fatty acids into circulation where they can be catabolised to generate energy in tissues such as skeletal muscle when required.

Glucose is stored in the liver in the form of the polysaccharide glycogen, which is a glucan (a polymer made up of glucose molecules). Liver cells (hepatocytes) have glucagon receptors. When glucagon binds to the glucagon receptors, the liver cells convert the glycogen into individual glucose molecules and release them into the bloodstream, in a process known as glycogenolysis. As these stores become depleted, glucagon then encourages the liver and kidney to synthesize additional glucose by gluconeogenesis. Glucagon turns off glycolysis in the liver, causing glycolytic intermediates to be shuttled to gluconeogenesis.

Glucagon also regulates the rate of glucose production through lipolysis. Glucagon induces lipolysis in humans under conditions of insulin suppression (such as diabetes mellitus type 1).

Glucagon production appears to be dependent on the central nervous system through pathways yet to be defined. In invertebrate animals, eyestalk removal has been reported to affect glucagon production. Excising the eyestalk in young crayfish produces glucagon-induced hyperglycemia.

Mechanism of action 

Glucagon binds to the glucagon receptor, a G protein-coupled receptor, located in the plasma membrane of the cell. The conformation change in the receptor activates G proteins, a heterotrimeric protein with α, β, and γ subunits. When the G protein interacts with the receptor, it undergoes a conformational change that results in the replacement of the GDP molecule that was bound to the α subunit with a GTP molecule. This substitution results in the releasing of the α subunit from the β and γ subunits. The alpha subunit specifically activates the next enzyme in the cascade, adenylate cyclase.

Adenylate cyclase manufactures cyclic adenosine monophosphate (cyclic AMP or cAMP), which activates protein kinase A (cAMP-dependent protein kinase). This enzyme, in turn, activates phosphorylase kinase, which then phosphorylates glycogen phosphorylase b (PYG b), converting it into the active form called phosphorylase a (PYG a). Phosphorylase a is the enzyme responsible for the release of glucose 1-phosphate from glycogen polymers.
An example of the pathway would be when glucagon binds to a transmembrane protein. The transmembrane proteins interacts with Gɑβ𝛾. Gɑ separates from Gβ𝛾 and interacts with the transmembrane protein adenylyl cyclase. Adenylyl cyclase catalyzes the conversion of ATP to cAMP. cAMP binds to protein kinase A, and the complex phosphorylates phosphorylase kinase. Phosphorylated phosphorylase kinase phosphorylates phosphorylase. Phosphorylated phosphorylase clips glucose units from glycogen as glucose 1-phosphate. 
Additionally, the coordinated control of glycolysis and gluconeogenesis in the liver is adjusted by the phosphorylation state of the enzymes that catalyze the formation of a potent activator of glycolysis called fructose 2,6-bisphosphate. The enzyme protein kinase A (PKA) that was stimulated by the cascade initiated by glucagon will also phosphorylate a single serine residue of the bifunctional polypeptide chain containing both the enzymes fructose 2,6-bisphosphatase and phosphofructokinase-2. This covalent phosphorylation initiated by glucagon activates the former and inhibits the latter. This regulates the reaction catalyzing fructose 2,6-bisphosphate (a potent activator of phosphofructokinase-1, the enzyme that is the primary regulatory step of glycolysis) by slowing the rate of its formation, thereby inhibiting the flux of the glycolysis pathway and allowing gluconeogenesis to predominate. This process is reversible in the absence of glucagon (and thus, the presence of insulin).

Glucagon stimulation of PKA also inactivates the glycolytic enzyme pyruvate kinase in hepatocytes.

Pathology 
Abnormally elevated levels of glucagon may be caused by pancreatic tumors, such as glucagonoma, symptoms of which include necrolytic migratory erythema, reduced amino acids, and hyperglycemia. It may occur alone or in the context of multiple endocrine neoplasia type 1.

Elevated glucagon is the main contributor to hyperglycemic ketoacidosis in undiagnosed or poorly treated type 1 diabetes. As the beta cells cease to function, insulin and pancreatic GABA are no longer present to suppress the freerunning output of glucagon. As a result, glucagon is released from the alpha cells at a maximum, causing a rapid breakdown of glycogen to glucose and fast ketogenesis . It was found that a subset of adults with type 1 diabetes took 4 times longer on average to approach ketoacidosis when given somatostatin (inhibits glucagon production) with no insulin. Inhibiting glucagon has been a popular idea of diabetes treatment, however, some have warned that doing so will give rise to brittle diabetes in patients with adequately stable blood glucose.

The absence of alpha cells (and hence glucagon) is thought to be one of the main influences in the extreme volatility of blood glucose in the setting of a total pancreatectomy.

History 
In the early 1920s, several groups noted that pancreatic extracts injected into diabetic animals would result in a brief increase in blood sugar prior to the insulin-driven decrease in blood sugar. In 1922, C. Kimball and John R. Murlin identified a component of pancreatic extracts responsible for this blood sugar increase, terming it "glucagon", a portmanteau of "glucose agonist". In the 1950s, scientists at Eli Lilly isolated pure glucagon, crystallized it, and determined its amino acid sequence. This led to the development of the first radioimmunoassay for detecting glucagon, described by Roger Unger's group in 1959.

A more complete understanding of its role in physiology and disease was not established until the 1970s, when a specific radioimmunoassay was developed.

See also 

 Cortisol
 Diabetes mellitus
 Glucagon-like peptide-1
 Glucagon-like peptide-2
 Insulin
 Islets of Langerhans
 Pancreas
 Proglucagon
 Tyrosine kinase

References

External links

 PDBe-KB provides an overview of all the structure information available in the PDB for Human Glucagon

Animal products
Hormones of glucose metabolism
Human hormones
Pancreatic hormones
Peptide hormones